MBE may refer to:

Academic qualifications
 Master of Bioethics
 Master of Bioscience Enterprise
 Master of Business Engineering
 Master of Business Economics

Science and technology 
 The Mid-Brunhes Event, a climatic change at around 430,000 years ago
 Mode-based Execution Control, an x86 virtualization technology 
 Model-based enterprise, a manufacturing strategy where a 3D model of a product is used to guide its life cycle
 Molecular-beam epitaxy, a thin-film crystal growth technique
 Molecular Biology and Evolution, a journal
 Multi-band excitation, a series of speech coding standards
 Multibeam echosounder, a device used to map ocean floors

British honours 

 Member of the Most Excellent Order of the British Empire

Other uses
 Mail Boxes Etc., a global chain of retail business service centers
 Management by exception, a style of business management
 Minority business enterprise, a classification of business
 Morning Becomes Eclectic, a radio program
 Multistate Bar Examination, an exam administered to most prospective American lawyers
 Monbetsu Airport's IATA code

See also 
 Mbe (disambiguation)